Sannavur (South) is a village in the Ariyalur taluk of Ariyalur district, Tamil Nadu, India.

Sannavur Panchayat President election results:
Election held on 13.10.2006
Mrs. Chellammal Ganesan won and secured 1189 votes
Mrs. Veerasamy secured 829 votes
Mrs. Chinnamuthu secured 104 votes
Not valid 156 votes
Polled 2278 votes out of 2510 total votes.

Demographics 
As per the 2001 census, Sannavur (South) had a total population of 1733 with 839 males and 894 females.

References 

Villages in Ariyalur district